The Creative Writer is a book series published by J. D. Vine Publications. The books are anthologies of winning stories and poems from competitions J. D. Vine Publications runs. Every book has a featured author and featured poet. The first volume, The Creative Writer: A Lucky Man and Shatter with other stories and poems, was released in 2007. Its featured author is Lynda Myles and its featured poet is Elli Westmoreland. The second volume, The Creative Writer: Quaquay's Birthday & Uncharted Life with other stories and poems, was released in 2008. Its featured author is animatqua and its featured poet is Sally O'Quinn. The series is edited by Jared D. Vineyard.

Fiction anthologies
Poetry anthologies
Book series introduced in 2007
Anthology series